Cerro El Roble is a mountain in central Chile. Much of the land area associated with this mountain was incorporated into the La Campana National Park in the late 1990s. A station of the National Astronomical Observatory of Chile, Cerro El Roble Observatory is located at the top of this mountain.

See also
 Asteroid

References

Notes

Bibliography
 C. Michael Hogan. 2008. Chilean Wine Palm: Jubaea chilensis, GlobalTwitcher.com, ed. N. Stromberg
 Royal Astronomical Society. 1985. The Quarterly Journal of the Royal Astronomical Society, v.26, Published for the Royal Astronomical Society by Blackwell Science

Chilean Coast Range
Mountains of Santiago Metropolitan Region
Mountains of Valparaíso Region